The 2008 International Formula Master season was the second International Formula Master series season.

Teams and drivers
All teams use a Tatuus chassis with a Honda K20A engine

Race calendar

Championship Standings

Drivers

 Half points were awarded for Race 2 at Pau as less than 75% of the scheduled distance was completed.

Teams

 Half points were awarded for Race 2 at Pau as less than 75% of the scheduled distance was completed.

References

Reference:

External links
International Formula Master official website

International Formula Master seasons
International Formula Master
International Formula Master